The 2012 FIM Torun Speedway Grand Prix of Poland was the twelfth race meeting of the 2012 Speedway Grand Prix season. It took place on October 6 at the MotoArena Toruń in Toruń, Poland.

Former three-times World Champion, Jason Crump, announced his SGP retirement after the Toruń SGP.

The Grand Prix was won by Antonio Lindbäck who beat Tomasz Gollob, Greg Hancock and Chris Holder in the final.

Riders 
The Speedway Grand Prix Commission nominated Maciej Janowski as Wild Card, and Emil and Kamil Pulczyński both as Track Reserves. Injured Kenneth Bjerre was replaced by first Qualified Substitutes, Martin Vaculík. The draw was made on October 5.
 (7)  Kenneth Bjerre → (19)  Martin Vaculík

Results

Heat details

Heat after heat 
 (60,97) Vaculík, Andersen, Jonsson, Hampel
 (60,87) Gollob, Hancock, N.Pedersen, Ljung
 (60,68) Sayfutdinov, Lindbäck, Harris, B.Pedersen
 (60,10) Holder, Lindgren, Crump, Janowski
 (59,97) Lindgren, Gollob, Harris, Andersen
 (59,80) Holder, Sayfutdinov, Hampel, Hancock
 (59,87) Lindbäck, Vaculík, N.Pedersen, Crump
 (60,22) Janowski, Jonsson, B.Pedersen, Ljung
 (60,15) Lindbäck, Hancock, Janowski, Andersen
 (60,81) Gollob, B.Pedersen, Crump, Hampel (R)
 (60,97) Vaculík, Ljung, Holder, Harris
 (60,10) N.Pedersen, Sayfutdinov, Lindgren, Jonsson
 (60,29) Holder, N.Pedersen, Andersen, B.Pedersen
 (60,13) Lindbäck, Hampel, Lindgren, Ljung
 (60,25) Gollob, Janowski, Sayfutdinov, Vaculík
 (60,56) Hancock, Crump, Harris, Jonsson
 (60,41) Sayfutdinov, Andersen, Crump, Ljung
 (60,40) Harris, Janowski, N.Pedersen, Hampel
 (60,62) Vaculík, Hancock, Lindgren, B.Pedersen
 (60,53) Gollob, Holder, Jonsson, Lindbäck
 Semifinals
 (59,94)21. Gollob, Hancock, Vaculik, Janowski
 (60,87)22. Holder, Lindbäck, N.Pedersen, Sayfutdinov
 the Final
 (60,75)23. Lindbäck, Gollob, Hancock, Holder (R1)

The final classification

References

See also 
 motorcycle speedway

Speedway Grand Prix of Poland
Poland II
2012
Sport in Toruń